The 2014 Northeast Conference women's basketball tournament will be held between March 9, 12, and 11, 2014. The 2014 Northeast Conference tournament will feature the league's top eight seeds. The tourney opens on Sunday, March 9 with the quarterfinals, followed by the semifinals on Wednesday, March 12 and the finals on Sunday, March 16. The champion will earn a trip to the 2014 NCAA tournament.

Bracket

All games will be played at the venue of the higher seed

References

 
Northeast Conference women's basketball tournament
Northeast Conference women's basketball tournament